Louis Charles César Le Tellier, Duke d'Estrées (2 July 1695 – 2 January 1771) was a French military commander and Marshal of France.

Biography

His mother was Marie Anne d'Estrées (†1741), daughter of Marshal Jean II d'Estrées (1624–1707) and younger sister of Marshal Victor Marie d'Estrées.

He married twice, to Anne Catherine de Champagne La Suze, and to Adélaïde Félicité de Brûlart de Sillery de Puysieux.

He was inspector general of the cavalry and as lieutenant general, he distinguished himself in the Battle of Fontenoy (1745)

A Marshal of France since 24 February 1757, he was commander of the armies in Westphalia during the Seven Years' War. On 26 July 1757, he won the Battle of Hastenbeck against Hanoverian and Hessian troops under the Duke of Cumberland during the Invasion of Hanover but was replaced as French commander shortly afterwards. He became Minister of State on July 2, 1758.

In 1759, following the French defeat at the Battle of Minden, he was ordered to conduct a tour of inspection of French forces in Germany.

He became a knight in the Order of the Holy Spirit in 1746 and received the title of Duc d'Estrées in 1763 from his mother's family.

He was a Freemason from 1736.

Bibliography 

 Luc-Normand Tellier, Face aux Colbert : les Le Tellier, Vauban, Turgot ... et l'avènement du libéralisme, Presses de l'Université du Québec, 1987, 816 pages.Etext

1695 births
1771 deaths
 6
Marshals of France
House of Le Tellier
Recipients of the Order of the White Eagle (Poland)